Hormiphora plumosa is a species of comb jelly in the family Pleurobrachiidae.

References 

Pleurobrachiidae
Animals described in 1859
Taxa named by Michael Sars